The 2008 Quebec general election was held in the Canadian province of Quebec on December 8, 2008. The Quebec Liberal Party, under incumbent Premier Jean Charest, was re-elected with a majority government, marking the first time since the 1950s (when the Union Nationale of Maurice Duplessis won four consecutive elections) that a party or leader was elected to a third consecutive mandate, and the first time for the Liberals since the 1930s, when Louis-Alexandre Taschereau was Premier.

The 2008 election also marked the first time that Québec solidaire won a seat.

Issues
Charest called the election on November 5, saying he needed a "clear mandate" and a majority to handle the economic storm. He was criticized, however, by the Parti Québécois and the Action démocratique du Québec for calling a snap election to get a majority when they were willing to work with him to fix the economy.

Most notably, the election was marked by a significant collapse in support for the ADQ. Formerly a relatively minor party, the ADQ had attracted significant protest support in the 2007 election, beating the Parti Québécois to Official Opposition status. In 2008, however, the party's support dropped back to approximately 15 per cent of the popular vote, roughly the same range of support the party attracted before 2007. As a result of this loss of support, Mario Dumont announced in his concession speech that he would step down as party leader.

In the final days of the election campaign, the concurrent parliamentary confidence dispute became an issue, with Prime Minister Stephen Harper attacking the credibility of a potential Liberal-New Democratic Party coalition government because the Bloc Québécois had pledged to support the coalition on motions of confidence. Both Marois and Dumont called upon Charest, a former leader of the federal Progressive Conservatives, to clarify where he stood on the coalition and on Harper's use of anti-sovereigntist rhetoric in the dispute. Charest emphasized that the Bloc MPs had been legitimately elected by Quebecers, and stated that "I live in a society in which people can be sovereigntists or federalists, but they respect each other. The same thing should prevail in the federal parliament."

Media analysts noted that while Charest's Liberals won a majority, the final result was much narrower in both the popular vote and the seat total than polls even just a few days before the election had predicted, because the Liberals only won an eight-seat majority, a result which was widely credited to a late voter swing toward the PQ as a result of Harper's comments.

Timeline

2007
March 26 - 38th Quebec general election
April 4 - Mario Dumont becomes the leader of the Official Opposition.
April 5 - Swearing in of the liberals members of the National Assembly
April 12 - Swearing in of the ADQs members of the National Assembly
April 18 - Swearing in of the Cabinet members
April 25 - Swearing in of the PQs members of the National Assembly
May 8 - Resignation of André Boisclair as leader of the Parti Québécois
May 9 - The opening speech of the 38th National Assembly of Quebec is pronounced by Premier Jean Charest.
May 10 - François Gendron becomes the interim leader of the Parti Québécois, so the leader of the Second Opposition group.
May 24 - The budget speech is pronounced by Monique Jérôme-Forget. Both opposition parties announce that they will vote against the budget, causing a crisis in the National Assembly.
June 1 - Monique Jérôme-Forget adds 111 million dollars to the budget to avoid the holding of a general election. The budgetary policy is approved by 46 votes against 44.
June 7 - Pierre Duchesne becomes the twenty-eighth Lieutenant Governor of Quebec.
June 26 - Pauline Marois is elected as leader of the Parti Québécois without opposition.
August 13 - Resignation of Rosaire Bertrand as MNA of Charlevoix
September 24 - In a by-election, Pauline Marois is elected MNA of Charlevoix with 59.2% of the vote.
October 17 - Resignation of Diane Lemieux as MNA of Bourget
November 15 - Resignation of André Boisclair as MNA of Pointe-aux-Trembles

2008
March 8 - 97.2% of the liberals delegates support their leader, Jean Charest.
March 13 - Monique Jérôme-Forget pronounces her second budget speech. Mario Dumont announces that the ADQ will vote for the budget, whereas Pauline Marois announces that the PQ will vote against. Thus, the government is safe.
March 16 - 94.8% of the ADQ's delegates support their leader, Mario Dumont.
March 29 - Guy Rainville is elected as leader of the Green Party against Scott McKay.
April 9 - Resignation of Roch Cholette as MNA of Hull
May 12 - In by-elections, Maka Kotto, Maryse Gaudreault and Nicole Léger are respectively elected MNAs of Bourget, Hull and Pointe-aux-Trembles. The voter turnout is around 34% in the three electoral districts.
June 25 - Resignation of Philippe Couillard as MNA of Jean-Talon and swearing in of Yves Bolduc as minister of Health and Social Services
July 14 - Resignation of Michel Bissonnet as president of the National Assembly
September 24 - Resignation of Michel Bissonnet as MNA of Jeanne-Mance–Viger
September 29 - In a by-election, Yves Bolduc is elected MNA of Jean-Talon with 58.5% of the vote.
October 21 - Election of François Gendron as president of the National Assembly
October 22 - Resignation of Russell Copeman as MNA of Notre-Dame-de-Grâce
October 23 - ADQ members of the National Assembly André Riedl and Pierre-Michel Auger cross the floor to sit as members of the Liberal caucus.
November 5 - Premier Jean Charest calls a general election for December 8.
November 25 - Leaders debate

Party standings
The overall results were:

|- style="background-color:#CCCCCC;"
! rowspan="2" colspan="2" style="text-align:left;" | Party
! rowspan="2" style="text-align:left;" | Party leader
! rowspan="2" style="text-align:center;font-size:80%;" | Candi-dates
! colspan="5" style="text-align:center;" | Seats
! colspan="3" style="text-align:center;" | Popular vote
|- style="background-color:#CCCCCC;text-align:center;"
| 2007
| style="font-size:80%;" | Dissol.
| 2008
| style="font-size:80%;" | Change
| %
| #
| %
| style="font-size:80%;" | Change

| style="text-align:left;" | Jean Charest
| 125
| 48
| 48
| 66
| +18
| 52.80%
| 1,366,046
| 42.08%
| +9.00%

| style="text-align:left;" | Pauline Marois
| 125
| 36
| 36
| 51
| +15
| 40.80%
| 1,141,751
| 35.17%
| +6.82%

| style="text-align:left;" | Mario Dumont
| 125
| 41
| 39
| 7
| -34
| 5.60%
| 531,358
| 16.37%
| -14.47%

| style="text-align:left;" | Françoise DavidAmir Khadir†
| 122
| -
| -
| 1
| +1
| 0.80%
| 122,618
| 3.78%
| +0.14%

| style="text-align:left;" | Guy Rainville
| 80
| -
| -
| -
| -
| -
| 70,393
| 2.17%
| -1.68%

| style="text-align:left;" | Éric Tremblay
| 19
| *
| -
| -
| *
| -
| 4,227
| 0.13%
| *

| style="text-align:left;" | Pierre Chénier
| 23
| -
| -
| -
| -
| -
| 2,727
| 0.08%
| +0.03%
 
| style="text-align:left;" | Durable
| style="text-align:left;" | Sébastien Girard
| 1
| *
| -
| -
| *
| -
| 567
| 0.02%
| *
 
| style="text-align:left;" | Republic of Quebec
| style="text-align:left;" | Gilles Paquette
| 1
| *
| -
| -
| *
| -
| 140
| <0.01%
| *

| colspan="2" style="text-align:left;" | Independents
| 30
| -
| -
| -
| -
| -
| 6,506
| 0.20%
| +0.09%

| style="text-align:left;" colspan="4" | Vacant
| 2
| style="text-align:center;" colspan="5" |  
|- style="font-weight:bold;"
| style="text-align:left;" colspan="3" | Total
| 651
| 125
| 125
| 125
| -
| 100%
| 3,246,333
| 100%
|-
| style="text-align:left;" colspan="13" | Notes:
"Change" refers to change from previous election.
† The party designated David and Khadir as co-spokespeople; the de jure leader recognized by the Directeur général des éléctions was Benoît Renaud.
* Party did not nominate candidates in the previous election.
|-
|}

Opinion polls

Campaign slogans
Action démocratique du Québec: Donnez-vous le pouvoir ("Give yourselves the power")
Parti libéral du Québec: L'économie d'abord OUI ("The economy first YES")
Parti québécois: Québec gagnant avec Pauline ("Quebec is a winner with Pauline")
Parti vert du Québec : Votons pour l'avenir ("Let's vote for the future")
Québec solidaire : Pour un système de santé public / Pour des salaires décents / Pour une souveraineté solidaire / Pour une économie verte et locale / Pour Éole Québec ("For a public health system" / "For decent incomes" / "For an independence in solidarity" / "For a green and local economy" / "For Wind Québec" [Éole Québec is a play on the state-run Hydro-Québec power utility, and refers to the nationalization of the wind energy industry])

Incumbent MNAs not running for re-election

Liberals
Maurice Clermont, Mille-Îles
Jean-Marc Fournier, Châteauguay
Benoît Pelletier, Chapleau

Péquistes
Maxime Arseneau, Îles-de-la-Madeleine
Jacques Côté, Dubuc
Serge Deslières, Beauharnois
Rita Dionne-Marsolais, Rosemont
Louise Harel, Hochelaga-Maisonneuve
Guy Lelièvre, Gaspé

List of candidates and results per riding 
The results in each riding (electoral division) were:

Bas-Saint-Laurent and Gaspésie–Îles-de-la-Madeleine

|-
|bgcolor=whitesmoke|Bonaventure
||
|Nathalie Normandeau  10,707  64.29%
|
|Denise Porlier  586  3.52%
|
|Marcel Landry  4,829  28.99%
|
|
|
|Patricia Chartier   533  3.20%
|
|
||
|Nathalie Normandeau
|-
|bgcolor=whitesmoke|Gaspé
||
|Georges Mamelonet  8,886  56.08%
|
|Marcelle Guay  499  3.15%
|
|Annie Chouinard  6,285  39.67%
|
|
|
|Simon Tremblay-Pepin  175  1.10%
|
|
||
|Guy Lelièvre
|-
|bgcolor=whitesmoke|Îles-de-la-Madeleine
||
|Germain Chevarie  3,510  49.85%
|
|Patrick Leblanc  121  1.72%
|
|Jeannine Richard  3,194  45.36%
|
|Nicolas Tremblay  129  1.83%
|
|Jacques Bourdeau  87  1.24%
|
|
||
|Maxime Arseneau
|-
|bgcolor=whitesmoke|Kamouraska-Témiscouata
||
|Claude Béchard  11,048  53.70%
|
|Ian Sénéchal  4,436  21.56%
|
|Michel Forget  4,351  21.15%
|
|
|
|Manon Côté  604  2.94%
|
|Alexie Plourde (Ind.)  134  0.65%
||
|Claude Béchard
|-
|bgcolor=whitesmoke|Matane
|
|Éric Plourde  5,503  33.27%
|
|Denis Paquette  1,127  6.81%
||
|Pascal Bérubé  9,589  57.98%
|
|
|
|Gilles Arteau  320  1.93%
|
|
||
|Pascal Bérubé
|-
|bgcolor=whitesmoke|Matapédia
|
|Jean-Yves Roy  5,828  33.94%
|
|Cindy Rousseau  1,982  11.54%
||
|Danielle Doyer  8,815  51.34%
|
|
|
|Eve-Lyne Couturier  544  3.17%
|
|
||
|Danielle Doyer
|-
|bgcolor=whitesmoke|Rimouski
|
|Raymond Guiguère  9,424  35.33%
|
|Frédéric Audet  3,410  12.78%
||
|Irvin Pelletier  12,873  48.26%
|
|
|
|Alain Thibault  967  3.63%
|
|
||
|Irvin Pelletier
|-
|bgcolor=whitesmoke|Rivière-du-Loup
|
|Jean-Pierre Rioux  5,795  26.98%
||
|Mario Dumont  11,115  51.75%
|
|Stephan Shields  3,049  14.20%
|
|Alain Gagnon  513  2.39%
|
|Stacy Larouche  400  1.86%
|
|Victor-Lévy Beaulieu (Ind.)  607  2.83%
||
|Mario Dumont
|}

Côte-Nord and Saguenay–Lac-Saint-Jean

|-
|bgcolor=whitesmoke|Chicoutimi
|
|Joan Simard  12,128  41.61%
|
|Jean-Philippe Marin  2,455  8.42%
||
|Stéphane Bédard  13,402  45.98%
|
|
|
|Réjean Godin  1,164  3.99%
|
|
||
|Stéphane Bédard
|-
|bgcolor=whitesmoke|Dubuc
||
|Serge Simard  9,723  42.85%
|
|Robert Émond  2,789  12.29%
|
|André Michaud  9,272  40.86%
|
|
|
|Marie-France Bienvenue  708  3.12%
|
|Fernand Bouchard (Ind.)  199  0.88%
||
|Jacques Côté
|-
|bgcolor=whitesmoke|Duplessis
|
|Pierre Cormier  6,300  34.28%
|
|Bernard Lefrançois  1,532  8.34%
||
|Lorraine Richard  9,619  52.34%
|
|Jacques Gélineau  459  2.50%
|
|Olivier Noël  469  2.55%
|
|
||
|Lorraine Richard
|-
|bgcolor=whitesmoke|Jonquière
|
|Martine Girard  10,367  37.80%
|
|Marc Jomphe  2,913  10.62%
||
|Sylvain Gaudreault  13,077  47.68%
|
|
|
|Gabrielle Desbiens  1,068  3.89%
|
|
||
|Sylvain Gaudreault
|-
|bgcolor=whitesmoke|Lac-Saint-Jean
|
|Pierre Simard  7,825  29.94%
|
|Sylvain Carbonneau  2,764  10.57%
||
|Alexandre Cloutier  14,539  55.62%
|
|France Bergeron  483  1.85%
|
|Samuel Thivierge  527  2.02%
|
|
||
|Alexandre Cloutier
|-
|bgcolor=whitesmoke|René-Lévesque
|
|Patrick Sullivan  4,725  26.29%
|
|Louis-Olivier Minville  2,198  12.23%
||
|Marjolain Dufour  10,554  58.71%
|
|
|
|Marie-Claude Ouellette  498  2.77%
|
|
||
|Marjolain Dufour
|-
|bgcolor=whitesmoke|Roberval
|
|Georges Simard  10,905  40.07%
|
|Jacques Cadieux  2,641  9.70%
||
|Denis Trottier  12,528  46.03%
|
|
|
|Nicole Schmitt  571  2.10%
|
|Sébastien Girard (PDQ)  571  2.10%
||
|Denis Trottier
|}

Capitale-Nationale

|-
|bgcolor=whitesmoke|Charlesbourg
||
|Michel Pigeon  14,196  42.35%
|
|Catherine Morissette  9,814  29.28%
|
|Renaud Lapierre  8,449  25.20%
|
|
|
|Martine Sanfaçon  1,063  3.17%
|
|
||
|Catherine Morissette
|-
|bgcolor=whitesmoke|Charlevoix
|
|Jean-Luc Simard  6,252  31.00%
|
|Marc Cardwell  2,568  12.73%
||
|Pauline Marois  10,532  52.21%
|
|David Turcotte  326  1.62%
|
|André Jacob  340  1.69%
|
|Jean-Michel Harvey (Ind.)  152  0.75%
||
|Pauline Marois
|-
|bgcolor=whitesmoke|Chauveau
|
|Sarah Perreault  10,359  33.76%
||
|Gérard Deltell  13,281  43.28%
|
|François Aumond  6,267  20.42%
|
|
|
|Catherine Flynn  778  2.54%
|
|
||
|Gilles Taillon
|-
|bgcolor=whitesmoke|Jean-Lesage
||
|André Drolet  11,682  41.68%
|
|Jean-François Gosselin  7,302  26.05%
|
|Hélène Guillemette  7,497  26.75%
|
|
|
|Jean-Yves Desgagnés  1,236  4.41%
|
|José Breton (Ind.)  314  1.12%
||
|Jean-François Gosselin
|-
|bgcolor=whitesmoke|Jean-Talon
||
|Yves Bolduc  13,885  49.79%
|
|Martin Briand  2,588  9.28%
|
|Patrick Neko Likongo  8,937  32.05%
|
|Nathalie Gingras  1,066  3.82%
|
|Marc-André Gauthier  1,410  5.06%
|
|
||
|Yves Bolduc
|-
|bgcolor=whitesmoke|La Peltrie
|
|France Hamel  13,133  38.09%
||
|Éric Caire  13,393  38.84%
|
|France Gagné  7,014  20.34%
|
|
|
|Guillaume Boivin  943  2.73%
|
|
||
|Éric Caire
|-
|bgcolor=whitesmoke|Louis-Hébert
||
|Sam Hamad  17,627  48.82%
|
|Jean Nobert  5,863  16.24%
|
|Françoise Mercure  10,508  29.10%
|
|Carl Lavoie  1,069  2.96%
|
|Dominique Gautron  1,037  2.87%
|
|
||
|Sam Hamad
|-
|bgcolor=whitesmoke|Montmorency
||
|Raymond Bernier  12,536  36.52%
|
|Hubert Benoit  11,375  33.14%
|
|Jacques Nadeau  8,784  25.59%
| 
|Jacques Legros  726  2.12%
|
|Lucie Charbonneau  751  2.19%
|
|Luc Duranleau (PI)  153  0.45%
||
|Hubert Benoit
|-
|bgcolor=whitesmoke|Portneuf
||
|Michel Matte  11,055  39.58%
|
|Raymond Francoeur  9,388  33.61%
|
|René Perreault  6,553  23.46%
|
|
|
|André Lavoie  934  3.34%
|
|
||
|Raymond Francoeur
|-
|bgcolor=whitesmoke|Taschereau
|
|Hébert Dufour  7,845  29.48%
|
|Renée-Claude Lizotte  3,563  13.39%
||
|Agnès Maltais  11,768  44.22%
|
|Antonine Yaccarini  1,048  3.94%
|
|Serge Roy  2,241  8.42%
|
|Mélanie Thériault (PI)  149  0.56%
||
|Agnès Maltais
|-
|bgcolor=whitesmoke|Vanier
||
|Patrick Huot  13,077  38.33%
|
|Sylvain Légaré  12,599  36.93%
|
|Éric Boucher  7,512  22.02%
|
|
|
|Monique Voisine  931  2.73%
|
|
||
|Sylvain Légaré
|}

Mauricie

|-
|bgcolor=whitesmoke|Champlain
|
|Pierre-Michel Auger  10,286  34.15%
|
|Luc Arvisais  6,582  21.86%
||
|Noëlla Champagne  12,317  40.91%
|
|
|
|Myriam Fauteux  714  2.37%
|
|Jean-Pierre Grenier (Ind.)  211  0.70%
||
|Pierre-Michel Auger
|-
|bgcolor=whitesmoke|Laviolette
||
|Julie Boulet  11,645  59.13%
|
|Éric Tapps  2,121  10.77%
|
|Claude Lessard  5,413  27.48%
|
|
|
|Rémy Francoeur  516  2.62%
|
|
||
|Julie Boulet
|-
|bgcolor=whitesmoke|Maskinongé
||
|Jean-Paul Diamond  13,277  42.18%
|
|Jean Damphousse  6,252  19.86%
|
|Rémy Désilets  10,841  34.44%
|
|
|
|Mariannick Mercure  709  2.25%
|
|Michel Thibeault (Ind.)  395  1.26%
||
|Jean Damphousse
|-
|bgcolor=whitesmoke|Saint-Maurice
|
|Céline Trépanier  8,138  38.43%
|
|Robert Deschamps  3,119  14.73%
||
|Claude Pinard  8,769  41.41%
|
|Stéphane Normandin  447  2.11%
|
|Allison Molesworth  429  2.03%
|
|Yves Demers (Ind.)  276  1.30%
||
|Robert Deschamps
|-
|bgcolor=whitesmoke|Trois-Rivières
||
|Danielle St-Amand  9,129  40.10%
|
|Sébastien Proulx  4,241  18.63%
|
|Yves St-Pierre  8,169  35.88%
|
|Louis Lacroix  515  2.26%
|
|Alex Noël  714  3.14%
|
|
||
|Sébastien Proulx
|}

Chaudière-Appalaches and Centre-du-Québec

|-
|bgcolor=whitesmoke|Arthabaska
||
|Claude Bachand  13,227  42.49%
|
|Jean-François Roux  7,735  24.85%
|
|Catherine Coutel  8,791  28.24%
|
|François Fillion  690  2.22%
|
|Bill Ninacs  685  2.20%
|
|
||
|Jean-François Roux
|-
|bgcolor=whitesmoke|Beauce-Nord
|
|Richard Lehoux  9,612  37.99%
||
|Janvier Grondin  12,633  49.93%
|
|Mireille Mercier-Roy  2,297  9.08%
|
|Francis Paré  381  1.51%
|
|Émilie Guimond-Bélanger  264  1.04%
|
|Benoît Roy (Ind.)  116  0.46%
||
|Janvier Grondin
|-
|bgcolor=whitesmoke|Beauce-Sud
||
|Robert Dutil  12,138  43.37%
|
|Claude Morin  11,499  41.09%
|
|André Côté  2,959  10.57%
|
|Francis Cossette  749  2.68%
|
|Anne-Marie Provost  307  1.10%
|
|Léo Doyon (Ind.)  332  1.19%
||
|Claude Morin
|-
|bgcolor=whitesmoke|Bellechasse
||
|Dominique Vien  10,530  47.79%
|
|Jean Domingue  7,553  34.28%
|
|Jerry Beaudoin  3,435  15.59%
|
|
|
|Jean-Nicolas Denis  518  2.35%
|
|
||
|Jean Domingue
|-
|bgcolor=whitesmoke|Chutes-de-la-Chaudière
|
|Réal St-Laurent  10,657  30.87%
||
|Marc Picard  15,366  44.51%
|
|Marie Raiche  7,428  21.52%
|
|
|
|Marie-Hélène Côté-Brochu  1,069  3.10%
|
|
||
|Marc Picard
|-
|bgcolor=whitesmoke|Drummond
|
|Jacques Sigouin  10,860  32.54%
|
|Sébastien Schneeberger  9,757  29.23%
||
|Yves-François Blanchet  11,480  34.40%
|
|
|
|Luce Daneau  1,279  3.83%
|
|
||
|Sébastien Schneeberger
|-
|bgcolor=whitesmoke|Frontenac
||
|Laurent Lessard  11,785  56.71%
|
|Paul-André Proulx  3,539  17.03%
|
|Juliette Jalbert  4,852  23.35%
|
|
|
|Claudette Lambert  423  2.04%
|
|Martin Duranleau (PI)  183  0.88%
||
|Laurent Lessard
|-
|bgcolor=whitesmoke|Johnson
|
|Denis F. Morin  8,478  30.99%
|
|Éric Charbonneau  6,318  23.09%
||
|Étienne-Alexis Boucher  11,012  40.25%
|
|Pierre-Olivier Jetté  919  3.36%
|
|Colombe Landry  634  2.32%
|
|
||
|Éric Charbonneau
|-
|bgcolor=whitesmoke|Lévis
||
|Gilles Lehouillier  12,645  38.76%
|
|Christian Lévesque  11,196  34.32%
|
|Jimmy Grenier  7,326  22.46%
|
|
|
|Valérie Guilloteau  1,457  4.47%
|
|
||
|Christian Lévesque
|-
|bgcolor=whitesmoke|Lotbinière
|
|Julie Champagne  7,540  34.31%
||
|Sylvie Roy  9,615  43.75%
|
|Guy St-Pierre  4,238  19.28%
|
|
|
|Guillaume Dorval  586  2.67%
|
|
||
|Sylvie Roy
|-
|bgcolor=whitesmoke|Montmagny-L'Islet
||
|Norbert Morin  10,027  51.90%
|
|Claude Roy  5,596  28.96%
|
|Guy Bélanger  3,048  15.78%
|
|Richard Piper  356  1.84%
|
|Bernard Beaulieu  294  1.52%
|
|
||
|Claude Roy
|-
|bgcolor=whitesmoke|Nicolet-Yamaska
|
|Mario Landry  7,991  34.56%
|
|Éric Dorion  6,052  26.17%
||
|Jean-Martin Aussant  8,132  35.17%
|
|
|
|Marianne Mathis  950  4.11%
|
|
||
|Éric Dorion
|}

Estrie (Eastern Townships)

|-
|bgcolor=whitesmoke|Mégantic-Compton
||
|Johanne Gonthier  9,204  45.32%
|
|Samuel Therrien  3,268  16.09%
|
|Gloriane Blais  7,079  34.85%
|
|
|
|Julie Dionne  760  3.74%
|
|
||
|Johanne Gonthier
|-
|bgcolor=whitesmoke|Orford
||
|Pierre Reid  14,728  43.46%
|
|Pierre Harvey  4,525  13.35%
|
|Michel Breton  12,470  36.80%
|
|Louis Hamel  1,030  3.04%
|
|Patricia Tremblay  1,135  3.35%
|
|
||
|Pierre Reid
|-
|bgcolor=whitesmoke|Richmond
||
|Yvon Vallières  11,657  51.50%
|
|Jean-Philippe Hamel  3,682  16.27%
|
|Martyne Prévost  6,535  28.87%
|
|
|
|Michel Reesor  760  3.36%
|
|
||
|Yvon Vallières
|-
|bgcolor=whitesmoke|Saint-François
||
|Monique Gagnon-Tremblay  13,327  46.96%
|
|Vincent Marmion  2,230  7.86%
|
|Réjean Hébert  11,845  41.74%
|
|
|
|Sandy Tremblay  769  2.71%
|
|François Mailly (Ind.)  210  0.74%
||
|Monique Gagnon-Tremblay
|-
|bgcolor=whitesmoke|Sherbrooke
||
|Jean Charest  13,694  45.21%
|
|Jacques Joly  2,065  6.82%
|
|Laurent-Paul Maheux  11,380  37.57%
|
|Steve Dubois  1,016  3.35%
|
|Christian Bibeau  1,956  6.46%
|
|Hubert Richard (Ind.)  178  0.59%
||
|Jean Charest
|}

Montérégie

Eastern Montérégie

|-
|bgcolor=whitesmoke|Borduas
|
|Jacques Charbonneau  9,125  32.61%
|
|Jean Dion  3,430  12.26%
||
|Pierre Curzi  13,329  47.63%
|
|Marco Caron  914  3.27%
|
|Eric Noël  966  3.45%
|
|Michel Lepage (PI)  219  0.78%
||
|Pierre Curzi
|-
|bgcolor=whitesmoke|Brome-Missisquoi
||
|Pierre Paradis  14,926  49.11%
|
|Mario Charpentier  5,127  16.87%
|
|Richard Leclerc  8,280  27.24%
|
|Louise Martineau  1,006  3.31%
|
|Diane Cormier  884  2.91%
|
|Jacques-Antoine Normandin (Ind.)  171  0.56%
||
|Pierre Paradis
|-
|bgcolor=whitesmoke|Chambly
|
|Stéphanie Doyon  14,485  36.11%
|
|Richard Merlini  6,455  16.09%
||
|Bertrand St-Arnaud  16,049  40.01%
|
|Nicholas Lescarbeau  1,200  2.99%
|
|Jocelyn Roy  1,167  2.91%
|
|Ghislain Lebel (PI)  758  1.89%
||
|Richard Merlini
|-
|bgcolor=whitesmoke|Iberville
|
|André Riedl  9,075  32.01%
|
|Lyne Denechaud  6,087  21.47%
||
|Marie Bouillé  11,698  41.26%
|
|Guy Berger  882  3.11%
|
|André Dupuis  612  2.16%
|
|
||
|André Riedl
|-
|bgcolor=whitesmoke|Richelieu
|
|Christian Cournoyer  8,546  34.63%
|
|Patrick Fournier  3,127  12.67%
||
|Sylvain Simard  11,607  47.04%
|
|Patrick Lamothe  691  2.80%
|
|Paul Martin  704  2.85%
|
|
||
|Sylvain Simard
|-
|bgcolor=whitesmoke|Saint-Hyacinthe
|
|Claude Corbeil  11,609  37.38%
|
|Claude L'Écuyer  5,690  18.32%
||
|Émilien Pelletier  11,822  38.07%
|
|Louis-Pierre Beaudry  975  3.14%
|
|Richard Gingras  957  3.08%
|
|
||
|Claude L'Écuyer
|-
|bgcolor=whitesmoke|Saint-Jean
|
|Jean-Pierre Paquin  12,568  36.52%
|
|Lucille Méthé  6,266  18.21%
||
|Dave Turcotte  13,474  39.15%
|
|Éric Beaudry  1,034  3.00%
|
|Danielle Desmarais  768  2.23%
|
| Martin Rioux (PI)  189  0.55%  Guillaume Tremblay (Ind.)  118  0.34%
||
|Lucille Méthé
|-
|bgcolor=whitesmoke|Shefford
|
|Jean-Claude Tremblay  11,201  34.42%
||
|François Bonnardel  11,271  34.63%
|
|Jean-François Arseneault  8,019  24.64%
|
|Martin Giard  789  2.42%
|
|Ginette Moreau  1,085  3.33%
|
|Lucie Piédalue (Ind.)  181  0.56%
||
|François Bonnardel
|-
|bgcolor=whitesmoke|Verchères
|
|Vincent Sabourin  6,389  22.87%
|
|Daniel Castonguay  4,333  15.52%
||
|Stéphane Bergeron  15,457  55.37%
|
|Christine Hayes  842  3.02%
|
|Lynda Gadoury  737  2.64%
|
|Yvon Sylva Aubé (PI)  158  0.57%
||
|Stéphane Bergeron
|}

South Shore

|-
|bgcolor=whitesmoke|Beauharnois
|
|Louis-Charles Roy  8,811  33.64%
|
|Michael Betts  3,311  12.64%
||
|Guy Leclair  12,349  47.15%
|
|Stéphanie Théorêt  570  2.18%
|
|Maxime Larue-Bourdages  681  2.60%
|
|Christian Grenon (Ind.)  467  1.78%
||
|Serge Deslières
|-
|bgcolor=whitesmoke|Châteauguay
||
|Pierre Moreau  13,583  41.41%
|
|Geneviève Tousignant  4,115  12.54%
|
|Michel Pinard  13,132  40.03%
|
|Johanne Côté  967  2.95%
|
|Véronique Pronovost  677  2.06%
|
|Nicole Caron (PI)  215  0.66%   Hélène Héroux (M-L)  115  0.35%
||
|Jean-Marc Fournier
|-
|bgcolor=whitesmoke|Huntingdon
||
|Stéphane Billette  11,178  44.01%
|
|Albert De Martin  6,372  25.09%
|
|Joan Gosselin  6,988  27.51%
|
|
|
|Stéphane Thellen  863  3.40%
|
|
||
|Albert De Martin
|-
|bgcolor=whitesmoke|La Pinière
||
|Fatima Houda-Pepin  17,480  61.44%
|
|Marc-André Beauchemin  2,822  9.92%
|
|Jocelyne Duguay-Varfalvy  7,046  24.77%
|
|
|
|Nadine Beaudoin  971  3.41%
|
|Serge Patenaude (M-L)  131  0.46%
||
|Fatima Houda-Pepin
|-
|bgcolor=whitesmoke|Laporte
||
|Nicole Ménard  12,823  49.01%
|
|Alain Dépatie  2,462  9.41%
|
|Robert Pellan  8,765  33.50%
|
|Richard Morisset  1,162  4.44%
|
|Michèle St-Denis  954  3.65%
|
|
||
|Nicole Ménard
|-
|bgcolor=whitesmoke|La Prairie
|
|Marc Savard  13,621  37.41%
|
|Monique Roy Verville  5,162  14.18%
||
|François Rebello  16,322  44.83%
|
|
|
|Danielle Maire  759  2.08%
|
|Martin McNeil (Ind.)  392  1.08%   Normand Chouinard (M-L)  150  0.41%
||
|Monique Roy Verville
|-
|bgcolor=whitesmoke|Marguerite-D'Youville
|
|Jean-Robert Grenier  13,096  35.85%
|
|Simon-Pierre Diamond  6,731  18.43%
||
|Monique Richard  14,545  39.82%
|
|Thomas Goyette-Levac  1,097  3.00%
|
|Hugo Bergeron  1,059  2.90%
|
|
||
|Simon-Pierre Diamond
|-
|bgcolor=whitesmoke|Marie-Victorin
|
|Isabelle Mercille  6,185  28.92%
|
|Roger Dagenais  2,369  11.08%
||
|Bernard Drainville  11,026  51.56%
|
|Réal Langelier  665  3.11%
|
|Sébastien Robert  957  4.48%
|
|Yves Ménard (PI)  182  0.85%
||
|Bernard Drainville
|-
|bgcolor=whitesmoke|Soulanges
||
|Lucie Charlebois  11,564  46.29%
|
|Daniel Lavigne  2,992  11.98%
|
|Louisanne Chevrier  9,229  36.95%
|
|Denis Eperjusy  736  2.95%
|
|Jonathan Vallée-Payette  459  1.84%
|
|
||
|Lucie Charlebois
|-
|bgcolor=whitesmoke|Taillon
|
|Richard Bélisle  10,688  32.98%
|
|Karine Simard  3,889  12.00%
||
|Marie Malavoy  15,021  46.34%
|
|Simon Bernier  1,094  3.37%
|
|Manon Blanchard  1,374  4.24%
|
|Éric Tremblay (PI)  349  1.08%
||
|Marie Malavoy
|-
|bgcolor=whitesmoke|Vachon
|
|Georges Painchaud  8,802  32.26%
|
|Jean-François Denis  3,776  13.84%
||
|Camil Bouchard  13,203  48.39%
|
|Denis Durand  886  3.25%
|
|François Cyr  615  2.25%
|
|
||
|Camil Bouchard
|-
|bgcolor=whitesmoke|Vaudreuil
||
|Yvon Marcoux  15,827  54.08%
|
|Lucie Boudreault  2,578  8.81%
|
|Claude Turcotte  8,789  30.03%
|
|Julien Leclerc  1,083  3.70%
|
|Maria-Pia Chavez  543  1.86%
|
|Kevin Côté (Ind.)  305  1.04%  Gilles Paquette (PRQ)  140  0.48%
||
|Yvon Marcoux
|}

Montréal

East Montreal

|-
|bgcolor=whitesmoke|Anjou
||
|Lise Thériault  13,082
|
|Jacques Lachapelle  2,242
|
|Sébastien Richard  8,927
|
|Sylvie Morneau  727
|
|Francine Gagné  944
|
|
||
|Lise Thériault
|-
|bgcolor=whitesmoke|Bourassa-Sauvé
||
|Line Beauchamp  13,736
|
|Guy Mailloux  1,933
|
|Roland Carrier  6,059
|
|
|
|Enrico Gambardella  732
|
|
||
|Line Beauchamp
|-
|bgcolor=whitesmoke|Bourget
|
|Pierre MacNicoll  7,984
|
|Guy Boutin  2,677
||
|Maka Kotto  13,046
|
|Gilbert Caron  939
|
|Gaétan Legault  1,177
|
|Antonis Labbé (PI)  127
||
|Maka Kotto
|-
|bgcolor=whitesmoke|Crémazie
|
|Martin Cossette  11,757
|
|Diane Charbonneau  1,847
||
|Lisette Lapointe  12,947
|
|Daniel Hémond  778
|
|André Frappier  1,639
|
|
||
|Lisette Lapointe
|-
|bgcolor=whitesmoke|Gouin
|
|Édith Keays  4,974
|
|Caroline Giroux  895
||
|Nicolas Girard  10,276
|
|Stephen Marchant  753
|
|Françoise David  7,987
|
|Jonathan Godin (PI)  110
||
|Nicolas Girard
|-
|bgcolor=whitesmoke|Hochelaga-Maisonneuve
|
|Julie Tremblay  4,115
|
|Jean-Lévy Champagne  1,303
||
|Carole Poirier  10,529
|
|Sylvie Woods  816
|
|Serge Mongeau  2,502
|
|Christine Dandenault (M-L)  117
||
|Louise Harel
|-
|bgcolor=whitesmoke|Jeanne-Mance–Viger
||
|Filomena Rotiroti  16,303
|
|Luigi Verrelli  1,736
|
|Christine Normandin  3,379
|
|
|
|Céline Gingras  554
|
|Katia Proulx (Ind.)  284  Garnet Colly (M-L)  125
||
|Vacant
|-
|bgcolor=whitesmoke|LaFontaine
||
|Tony Tomassi  14,031
|
|Gaetano Giumento  1,306
|
|Luigi De Benedictis  3,838
|
|Gaétan Bérard  549
|
|Natacha Larocque  389
|
|
||
|Tony Tomassi
|-
|bgcolor=whitesmoke|Laurier-Dorion
||
|Gerry Sklavounos  9,769
|
|Olivier Manceau  943
|
|Badiona Bazin  7,701
|
|Michel Lemay  1,090
|
|Ruba Ghazal  2,963
|
|Peter Macrisopoulos (M-L)  219  Michel Prairie (Ind.)  86
||
|Gerry Sklavounos
|-
|bgcolor=whitesmoke|Mercier
|
|Catherine Émond  4,940
|
|Elysa Toutant  575
|
|Daniel Turp  7,989
|
|Olivier Adam  833
||
|Amir Khadir  8,861
|
|Jean-Marc Labrèche (PI)  83
||
|Daniel Turp
|-
|bgcolor=whitesmoke|Pointe-aux-Trembles
|
|Gilbert Thibodeau  5,581
|
|Pierre Trudelle  2,525
||
|Nicole Léger  12,845
|
|Xavier Daxhelet  733
|
|Marie-Josèphe Pigeon  664 
|
|Gérald Briand (Ind.)  159  Geneviève Royer (M-L)  81
||
|Nicole Léger
|-
|bgcolor=whitesmoke|Rosemont
|
|Nathalie Rivard  9,557
|
|Audrey Serec  1,901
||
|Louise Beaudoin  15,149
|
|Sylvain Valiquette  816
|
|François Saillant  2,470
|
|Stephane Chénier (M-L)  88
||
|Rita Dionne-Marsolais
|-
|bgcolor=whitesmoke|Sainte-Marie–Saint-Jacques
|
|Éric Prud'homme  5,536
|
|Dominic Boisvert  793
||
|Martin Lemay  9,135
|
|Annie Morel  1,089
|
|Manon Massé  3,009
|
|Serge Lachapelle (M-L)  207
||
|Martin Lemay
|-
|bgcolor=whitesmoke|Viau
||
|Emmanuel Dubourg  10,705
|
|Martin Fournier  1,186
|
|Martine Banolok  4,783
|
|Michel Cummings  678
|
|Rosa Dutra  916
|
|
||
|Emmanuel Dubourg
|}

West Montreal

|-
|-
|bgcolor=whitesmoke|Acadie
||
|Christine St-Pierre  15,240
|
|Ahamed Badawy  980
|
|Marc-André Nolet  4,717
|
|Nicolas Rémillard-Tessier  755
|
|André Parizeau  956
|
|
||
|Christine St-Pierre
|-
|bgcolor=whitesmoke|D'Arcy-McGee
||
|Lawrence Bergman  14,087
|
|Mathieu Lacombe  292
|
|Marie-Aude Ardizzon  564
| 
|Jean-Christophe Mortreux  666
|
|Abraham Weizfeld  264
|
|
||
|Lawrence Bergman
|-
|bgcolor=whitesmoke|Jacques-Cartier
||
|Geoffrey Kelley  20,428
|
|Marie-Hélène Trudel  980
|
|Olivier Gendreau  1,555
|
|Ryan Young  1,895
|
|Marianne Breton-Fontaine  364
|
|Marsha Fine (M-L)  87
||
|Geoffrey Kelley
|-
|bgcolor=whitesmoke|Marguerite-Bourgeoys
||
|Monique Jérôme-Forget  14,490
|
|Michel Beaudoin  1,900
|
|Félix Sylvestre-Kentzinger  4,750
|
|
|
|Elena Tapia  752
|
|
||
|Monique Jérôme-Forget
|-
|bgcolor=whitesmoke|Marquette
||
|François Ouimet  13,471
|
|Marc-Antoine Desjardins  2,062
|
|Catherine Major  6,451
|
|Réjean Malette  1,308
|
|Manuel Teigeiro  588
|
|Yves Le Seigle (M-L)  86
||
|François Ouimet
|-
|bgcolor=whitesmoke|Mont-Royal
||
|Pierre Arcand  12,205
|
|Caroline Morgan  555
|
|Simon Robert-Chartrand  1,854
|
|Mario Bonenfant  736
|
|Robbie Mahoud  577
|
|Diane Johnston (M-L)  69
||
|Pierre Arcand
|-
|bgcolor=whitesmoke|Nelligan
||
|Yolande James  18,039
|
|François Savard  1,418
|
|Anais Valiquette-L'Heureux  3,634
|
|Jonathan Théorêt  1,556
|
|Elahé Machouf  378
|
|
||
|Yolande James
|-
|bgcolor=whitesmoke|Notre-Dame-de-Grâce
||
|Kathleen Weil  11,485
|
|Matthew Conway  481
|
|Fabrice Martel  2,307
|
|Peter McQueen  2,430
|
|
|
|Linda Sullivan (M-L)  124  David Sommer Rovins (Ind.)  64
||
|Vacant
|-
|bgcolor=whitesmoke|Outremont
||
|Raymond Bachand  10,571
|
|Christian Collard  577
|
|Sophie Fréchette  4,919
|
|Maxime Simard  1,204
|
|May Chiu  2,228
|
|
||
|Raymond Bachand
|-
|bgcolor=whitesmoke|Robert-Baldwin
||
|Pierre Marsan  17,078
|
|Alexandra Lauzon  877
|
|Alexandre Pagé-Chassé  1,602
|
|Maryse Goulet  1,059
|
|Sarah Landry  375
|
|Nicholas Lin (M-L)  74
||
|Pierre Marsan
|-
|bgcolor=whitesmoke|Saint-Henri–Sainte-Anne
||
|Marguerite Blais  10,552
|
|Claude-Ludovic Mbany  1,326
|
|Frédéric Isaya  8,535
|
|Tim Landry  985
|
|Marie-Ève Rancourt  1,471
|
|Jean-Paul Bédard (M-L)  146
||
|Marguerite Blais
|-
|bgcolor=whitesmoke|Saint-Laurent
||
|Jacques P. Dupuis  15,663
|
|José Fiorilo  1,009
|
|Gabrielle Dufour-Turcotte  3,505
|
|
|
|William Sloan  731
|
|Fernand Deschamps (M-L)  147
||
|Jacques P. Dupuis
|-
|bgcolor=whitesmoke|Verdun
||
|Henri-François Gautrin  11,223
|
|Moscou Côté  1,411
|
|Richard Langlais  8,314
|
|Sébastien Beausoleil  1,087
|
|Chantale Michaud  1,215
|
|Sylvie Tremblay (Ind.)  216  Robert Lindblad (Ind.)  61
||
|Henri-François Gautrin
|-
|bgcolor=whitesmoke|Westmount–Saint-Louis
||
|Jacques Chagnon  11,041
|
|Léonidas Priftakis  438
|
|Daniella Johnson-Meneghini  1,525
|
|Patrick Daoust  1,090
|
|Nadia Alexan  641
|
|
||
|Jacques Chagnon
|}

Laval

|-
|bgcolor=whitesmoke|Chomedey
||
|Guy Ouellette  16,482
|
|Josée Granger  1,932
|
|Jonathan Cyr  5,218
|
|Christian Picard  618
|
|Francine Bellerose  547
|
|Polyvios Tsakanikas (M-L)  234
||
|Guy Ouellette
|-
|bgcolor=whitesmoke|Fabre
||
|Michelle Courchesne  15,349
|
|Tom Pentefountas  4,024
|
|François-Ghyslain Rocque  12,425
|
|Erika Alvarez  1,021
|
|Pierre Brien  918
|
|
||
|Michelle Courchesne
|-
|bgcolor=whitesmoke|Laval-des-Rapides
||
|Alain Paquet  11,551
|
|Robert Goulet  2,727
|
|Marc Demers  10,264
|
|Nicholas Sarrazin  779
|
|Sylvie DesRochers  758
|
|Mathieu Desbiens (PI)  151  Jacques Frigon (Ind.)  125  Yvon Breton (M-L)  114 
||
|Alain Paquet
|-
|bgcolor=whitesmoke|Mille-Îles
||
|Francine Charbonneau  15,334
|
|Pierre Tremblay  3,588
|
|Donato Santomo  12,124
|
|Maude Delangis  903
|
|Nicole Bellerose  905
|
|Isabelle Gérin-Lajoie (Ind.)  191  Régent Millette (Ind.)  44 
||
|Maurice Clermont
|-
|bgcolor=whitesmoke|Vimont
||
|Vincent Auclair  16,217
|
|Pierre Brien  3,932
|
|Rachel Demers  12,257
|
|
|
|Audrey Boisvert  1,537
|
|
||
|Vincent Auclair
|}

Lanaudière

|-
|bgcolor=whitesmoke|Berthier
|
|Norman Blackburn  8,393
|
|François Benjamin  8,239
||
|André Villeneuve  13,650
|
|Yan Beaudry  903
|
|Jocelyne Dupuis  931
|
|
||
|François Benjamin
|-
|bgcolor=whitesmoke|Joliette
|
|Christian Trudel  9,168
|
|Pascal Beaupré  6,171
||
|Véronique Hivon  14,647
|
|
|
|Flavie Trudel  1,544
|
|Pablo Lugo-Herrera (Ind.)  244
||
|Pascal Beaupré
|-
|bgcolor=whitesmoke|L'Assomption
|
|Christian Gauthier  11,384
|
|Éric Laporte  6,977
||
|Scott McKay  15,494
|
|Chantal Latour  946
|
|Olivier Huart  1,099
|
|Fanny Bérubé (PI)  341
||
|Éric Laporte
|-
|bgcolor=whitesmoke|Masson
|
|David Grégoire  8,174
|
|Ginette Grandmont  7,436
||
|Guillaume Tremblay  17,997
|
|Michel Paulette  954
|
|Gabriel Poirier  716
|
|Bertrand Lefebvre (PI)  257
||
|Ginette Grandmont
|-
|bgcolor=whitesmoke|Rousseau
|
|Michel Fafard  6,689
|
|Jean-Pierre Parrot  4,778
||
|François Legault  16,783
|
|Michel Popik  607
|
|François Lépine  730
|
|
||
|François Legault
|-
|bgcolor=whitesmoke|Terrebonne
|
|Chantal Leblanc  9,439
|
|Jean-François Therrien  7,377
||
|Mathieu Traversy  15,455
|
|Yoland Gilbert  1,103
|
|Sabrina Perreault  894
|
|
||
|Jean-François Therrien
|}

Laurentides

|-
|bgcolor=whitesmoke|Argenteuil
||
|David Whissell  10,843
|
|Michael Perzow  2,455 
|
|John Saywell  7,353
|
|Claude Sabourin  790
|
|Loïc Kauffeisen  456
|
|
||
|David Whissell
|-
|bgcolor=whitesmoke|Bertrand
|
|Isabelle Lord  10,424
|
|Diane Bellemare  3,463
||
|Claude Cousineau  14,970
|
|Michelle L. Déry  839
|
|Mylène Jaccoud  843
|
|
||
|Claude Cousineau
|-
|bgcolor=whitesmoke|Blainville
|
|Johanne Berthiaume  11,301
|
|Pierre Gingras  7,677
||
|Daniel Ratthé  14,118
|
|Michel Sigouin  962
|
|Francis Gagnon-Bergmann  798
|
|
||
|Pierre Gingras
|-
|bgcolor=whitesmoke|Deux-Montagnes
|
|Marie-France D'Aoust  8,979
|
|Lucie Leblanc  4,983
||
|Benoit Charette  11,932
|
|Guy Rainville  1,168
|
|Julien Demers  632
|
|
||
|Lucie Leblanc
|-
|bgcolor=whitesmoke|Groulx
|
|Monique Laurin  10,823
|
|Linda Lapointe  6,036
||
|René Gauvreau  11,226
|
|Carmen Brisebois  955
|
|Adam Veilleux  701
|
|Sébastien Hotte (PI)  102
||
|Linda Lapointe
|-
|bgcolor=whitesmoke|Labelle
|
|Déborah Bélanger  7,140
|
|Claude Ouellette  2,807
||
|Sylvain Pagé  13,195
|
|François Beauchamp  754
|
|Luc Boisjoli  751
|
|
||
|Sylvain Pagé
|-
|bgcolor=whitesmoke|Mirabel
|
|Ritha Cossette  7,207
|
|François Desrochers  6,522
||
|Denise Beaudoin  13,700
|
|Simon Cadieux  847
|
|Kim Joly  621
|
|
||
|François Desrochers
|-
|bgcolor=whitesmoke|Prévost
|
|Jacques Gariépy  10,001
|
|Martin Camirand  7,193
||
|Gilles Robert  15,229
|
|Bernard Anton  913
|
|Lise Boivin  1,107
|
|
||
|Martin Camirand
|}

Outaouais

|-
|bgcolor=whitesmoke|Chapleau
||
|Marc Carrière  13,968
|
|Gilles Taillon  3,182
|
|Yves Morin  6,560
|
|Roger Fleury  1,032
|
|Benoît Renaud  609
|
|Jean-Pierre Grenier (Ind.)  118   Pierre Soublière (M-L)  51
||
|Benoît Pelletier
|-
|bgcolor=whitesmoke|Gatineau
||
|Stéphanie Vallée  14,506
|
|Serge Charrette  2,395
|
|Thérèse Viel-Déry  7,176
|
|
|
|
|
|Benoit Legros (M-L)  304
||
|Stéphanie Vallée
|-
|bgcolor=whitesmoke|Hull
||
|Maryse Gaudreault  11,924
|
|Renée Gagné  1,319
|
|Gilles Aubé  7,602
|
|
|
|Bill Clennett  2,006
|
|Jean-Roch Villemaire (PI)  139  Gabriel Girard-Bernier (M-L)  101
||
|Maryse Gaudreault
|-
|bgcolor=whitesmoke|Papineau
||
|Norman MacMillan  13,786
|
|Bruno Lemieux  2,825
|
|Gilles Hébert  8,674
|
|Patrick Mailloux  790
|
|Françoise Breault  805
|
|Christian-Simon Ferlatte (M-L)  92
||
|Norman MacMillan
|-
|bgcolor=whitesmoke|Pontiac
||
|Charlotte L'Écuyer  12,960
|
|Christian Toussaint  1,215
|
|Nathalie Lepage  3,553
|
|Gail Lemmon Walker  950
|
|Charmain Lévy  804
|
|Lisa Leblanc (M-L)  122
||
|Charlotte L'Écuyer
|}

Abitibi-Témiscamingue and Nord-du-Québec

|-
|bgcolor=whitesmoke|Abitibi-Est
||
|Pierre Corbeil  8,942
|
|Samuel Dupras  1,742
|
|Alexis Wawanoloath  8,427
|
|
|
|Lizon Boucher  438
|
|
||
|Alexis Wawanoloath
|-
|bgcolor=whitesmoke|Abitibi-Ouest
|
|Claude Nelson Morin  5,309
|
|Sébastien D'Astous  2,182
||
|François Gendron  10,570
|
|
|
|
|
|Grégory Vézeau (PI)  370
||
|François Gendron
|-
|bgcolor=whitesmoke|Rouyn-Noranda–Témiscamingue
||
|Daniel Bernard  10,358
|
|Paul-Émile Barbeau  4,111
|
|Johanne Morasse  8,604
|
|
|
|Guy Leclerc  1,413
|
|
||
|Johanne Morasse
|-
|bgcolor=whitesmoke|Ungava
|
|Pierre Gaudreault  3,015
|
|Pascal Dion  917
||
|Luc Ferland  4,118
|
|
|
|Mélanie Dufour  439
|
|Gilbert Hamel (Ind.)  218
||
|Luc Ferland
|}

See also
 39th National Assembly of Quebec
 Politics of Quebec
 List of premiers of Quebec
 List of leaders of the Official Opposition (Quebec)
 National Assembly of Quebec
 Timeline of Quebec history
 Political parties in Quebec

References

External links
 Results by party (total votes and seats won)
 Results for all ridings
DemocraticSPACE 39e élection générale du Québec
Official election site by Chief Electoral Officer of Quebec
Predictions HKDP - Electoral Scenario Creator 
TrendLines Research Chart Tracking of 2008 Quebec MNA & Federal Riding Projection models
Quebec Politique.com
Election Almanac - Quebec Provincial Election

Elections in Quebec
Quebec general election
General election
Quebec general election